Ayuda Babes is a 2021 Philippine comedy film directed by Joven Tan. It stars Gardo Versoza, Ate Gay, Joey Paras, Negi, Juliana Pariscova Segovia, Brenda Mage and Iyah Mina. The film is about what people doing in their community while having a COVID-19 pandemic in the Philippines.

Synopsis
A hilarious look at the altered lifestyles of people in quarantine in need of doleouts.

Cast
 Gardo Versoza as Kapitana
 Ate Gay as Tet
 Joey Paras as Mama Rita
 Negi as Alma
 Juliana Parizcova Segovia as Marie
 Brenda Mage as Jean
 Iyah Mina as Pinky
 Marlo Mortel as Jun
 Zeus Collins as Dave
 Marc Logan as Marc Logan (himself)
 Petite as Lily
 Christi Fider as Jenny
 Bernie Batin as Tinderang Masungit
 Dan Delgado as Jr
 Japh Bahian as Talent

Release
The film was released in iWantTFC and Ktx.ph on March 5, 2021.

Reception
JE CC of MSN rate the film 2 out of 5 and wrote:

References

External links
 

2021 comedy films
Filipino-language films
Philippine parody films
Viva Films films
2021 LGBT-related films
Philippine LGBT-related films
Films impacted by the COVID-19 pandemic
Films about the COVID-19 pandemic
Films directed by Joven Tan